There are several stadiums that are associated with the name Aggie Stadium:

Aggie Stadium (UC Davis), now UC Davis Health Stadium
Aggie Stadium (North Carolina A&T), now Truist Stadium (North Carolina A&T)
Aggie Memorial Stadium, football venue for New Mexico State University

See also
Aggie Soccer Stadium, better known as Aggie Field, on the campus of the University of California, Davis
Aggie Soccer Stadium, former name of Ellis Field (Texas A&M), on the campus of Texas A&M University